63 may refer to: 
 63 (number)
 one of the years 63 BC, AD 63, 1963, 2063
 +63, telephone country code in the Philippines
 Flight 63 (disambiguation)
 63 (album), by Tree63
 63 (mixtape), by Kool A.D.
 "Sixty Three", a song by Karma to Burn from the album Mountain Czar, 2016